Long Pants (also known as Johnny Newcomer) is a 1927 American silent comedy film directed by Frank Capra and starring Harry Langdon.  Additional cast members include Gladys Brockwell, Alan Roscoe, and Priscilla Bonner.

Plot
The silent tells the story of Harry Shelby (Langdon) who has been kept in knee-pants for years by his mother. One day, however, Harry finally gets his first pair of long pants.

Immediately, his family expects him to marry his childhood sweetheart Priscilla (Priscilla Bonner).  Yet, Harry soon falls for Bebe Blair (Alma Bennett), a femme fatale from the big city who has a boyfriend in the mob.

Harry thinks that Bebe is interested in him as well, so he risks everything when Bebe ends up in jail. This leads to a lot of trouble for Harry. Throughout the whole ordeal Priscilla waits for Harry to face reality.

Cast

Critical reception
When it was released, film critic Mordaunt Hall gave the film a positive review.  He wrote, "Some hilarious passages enliven Harry Langdon's latest film oddity, Long' Pants...Although these incidents are acted with consummate skill, except for an occasional repetition, it is quite obvious to any male who has made the decisive change from short to long trousers that the idea offers possibilities far greater and more genuine than those that greet the eye. The answer is that Mr. Langdon has once again capitulated to his omnipotent band of gag-men. It may be all very well for Harold Lloyd to rely on mechanical twists, but Langdon possesses a cherubic countenance, which offers him a chance in other directions...Mr. Langdon is still Charles Spencer Chaplin's sincerest flatterer. His short coat reminds one of Chaplin, and now and again his footwork is like that of the great screen comedian."

Film historian David Kalat reports that Buster Keaton, a long-time fan of Langdon's known for his own morbid jokes about death and killings, criticized a scene in which Langdon's character tries to kill Priscilla as "going too far" in making light of murder.

More recently, critic Maria Schneider reviewed Langdon's work and wrote, "Long Pants (1927), also directed by Capra, was a peculiar change of pace for Langdon, and possibly an attempt to poke fun at his baby-faced image by casting him as a would-be lady-killer; sporting little of the ingenuity of The Strong Man, it was a box-office failure that set off the comedian's quick decline into obscurity. An acquired taste, Harry Langdon's gentle absurdities and slow rhythms take some getting used to, but patient viewers will be rewarded."

Film critic Hal Erikson wrote of the film, "Few comedies of the 1920s were as bizarre and surreal as Harry Langdon's Long Pants... Written by future director Arthur Ripley, Long Pants is as kinky as any of Ripley's film noirs of the 1940s. Long Pants represents the second and final collaboration between star Harry Langdon and director Frank Capra, who was fired when Langdon wrong-headedly decided to become his own director, resulting in a series of career-destroying flops."

See also
 List of United States comedy films

References

External links

.

.
Stills at silentsaregolden.com
Still at silenthollywood.com

1927 films
1927 comedy films
American black comedy films
American silent feature films
American coming-of-age films
American black-and-white films
First National Pictures films
Films directed by Frank Capra
1920s American films
Silent comedy-drama films
Silent American drama films
Silent American comedy films
Public domain